Menotti Jakobsson (7 July 1892 – 26 December 1970) was a Swedish skier. He was born in Stockholm. He competed in ski jumping and Nordic combined at the 1924 Winter Olympics in Chamonix.

References

External links

1892 births
1970 deaths
Sportspeople from Stockholm
Swedish male Nordic combined skiers
Swedish male ski jumpers
Olympic Nordic combined skiers of Sweden
Olympic ski jumpers of Sweden
Nordic combined skiers at the 1924 Winter Olympics
Ski jumpers at the 1924 Winter Olympics